Scheitler is a German language surname. Notable people with the name include:

 Metty Scheitler (1915–1972), Luxembourgian wrestler
 Nic Scheitler (1910–1999), Luxembourgian weightlifter

References 

German-language surnames
Surnames of Luxembourgian origin